Fereydoun Moeini (born 23 August 1946) is a retired Iranian football striker who has played all of his careers at Persepolis. He is also a teacher at the universities and was also team manager of Iran national football team. His brother, Masoud is also a former footballer and coach.

References

1946 births
Living people
Iranian footballers
Persepolis F.C. players
Footballers at the 1970 Asian Games
Persepolis F.C. non-playing staff
Asian Games competitors for Iran
Association football midfielders